Rock the Nations is the eighth studio album by English heavy metal band Saxon, released on 19 September 1986.

Album notes
The album is the first not to feature original bassist Steve Dawson, who was fired from the band earlier in 1986. For the recording of this album, vocalist Biff Byford, who had incidentally begun his career as a singer/bassist, recorded all the bass parts in Dawson's place. However, Paul Johnson joined the band as bassist before the album was released and is therefore credited in the liner notes.

Reception

Rock the Nations received mixed reviews from critics. Eduardo Rivadavia of AllMusic gave the album two stars out of five and said in his review for the band's previous album Innocence Is No Excuse that "Saxon's internal chemistry was significantly unbalanced by the subsequent departure of key songwriter [Steve] Dawson -- a loss from which they would take years to fully recover." in his review for this album, he said that although the album was "graced with a somewhat rougher sound more in line with the band's New Wave of British Heavy Metal early years" it was still "arguably less heavy than its predecessor" and also criticised the songs "We Came Here to Rock", "Running Hot" and the title track for being "cliché-ridden" and "Waiting for the Night" and "Northern Lady" for being "unconvincingly sappy ballads", though he did regard "Party 'til You Puke" as being "good for a laugh" and also of interest for the guest appearance of Elton John. However, he concluded that the album is one that "the Saxon faithful would likely rather forget". Canadian journalist Martin Popoff found Rock The Nations "a little more full-bodied production-wise and less overtly metallic and by-the-book construction-wise" than Innocence Is No Excuse, "while still suffering for coasting on [Saxon]'s scant laurels".

Track listing

Bonus tracks 15-17 recorded live at Reading Festival, 23 August 1986.

Personnel
Biff Byford – vocals, bass guitar
Graham Oliver – guitar
Paul Quinn – guitar
Paul Johnson – bass guitar (credited but does not play on the album)
Nigel Glockler – drums

 Production
 Gary Lyons – producer
 Wisseloord Studios, Hilversum, Netherlands – recording location
 Wisseloord Studios – mixing location
 Elton John – piano on tracks 7 and 9
 Paul R. Gregory – artwork

Charts

References

Saxon (band) albums
1986 albums
EMI Records albums